The metallic elements in the periodic table located between the transition metals and the chemically weak nonmetallic metalloids have received many names in the literature, such as post-transition metals, poor metals, other metals, p-block metals and chemically weak metals; none have been recommended by IUPAC. The most common name, post-transition metals, is generally used in this article. Depending on where the adjacent sets of transition metals and metalloids are judged to begin and end, there are at least five competing proposals for which elements to count as post-transition metals: the three most common contain six, ten and thirteen elements, respectively (see image). All proposals include gallium, indium, tin, thallium, lead, and bismuth.

Physically, these metals are soft (or brittle), have poor mechanical strength, and usually have melting points lower than those of the transition metals. Being close to the metal-nonmetal border, their crystalline structures tend to show covalent or directional bonding effects, having generally greater complexity or fewer nearest neighbours than other metallic elements.

Chemically, they are characterised—to varying degrees—by covalent bonding tendencies, acid-base amphoterism and the formation of anionic species such as aluminates, stannates, and bismuthates (in the case of aluminium, tin, and bismuth, respectively). They can also form Zintl phases (half-metallic compounds formed between highly electropositive metals and moderately electronegative metals or metalloids).

Applicable elements

Usually included in this category are the group 13–15 metals in periods 4–6: gallium, indium and thallium; tin and lead; and bismuth. Other elements sometimes included are platinum (usually considered to be a transition metal); the group 11 metals copper, silver and gold (which are usually considered to be transition metals); the group 12 metals zinc, cadmium and mercury (which are otherwise considered to be transition metals); and aluminium, germanium, arsenic, selenium, antimony, tellurium, and polonium (of which germanium, arsenic, antimony, and tellurium are usually considered to be metalloids). Astatine, which is usually classified as a nonmetal or a metalloid, has been predicted to have a metallic crystalline structure. If so, it would be a post-transition metal. Elements 112–118 (copernicium, nihonium, flerovium, moscovium, livermorium, tennessine, and oganesson) may be post-transition metals; insufficient quantities of them have been synthesized to allow sufficient investigation of their actual physical and chemical properties.

Which elements start to be counted as post-transition metals depends, in periodic table terms, on where the transition metals are taken to end. In the 1950s, most inorganic chemistry textbooks defined transition elements as finishing at group 10 (nickel, palladium and platinum), therefore excluding group 11 (copper, silver and gold), and group 12 (zinc, cadmium and mercury). A survey of chemistry books in 2003 showed that the transition metals ended at either group 11 or group 12 with roughly equal frequency. Where the post-transition metals end depends on where the metalloids or nonmetals start. Boron, silicon, germanium, arsenic, antimony and tellurium are commonly recognised as metalloids; other authors treat some or all of these elements as nonmetals. Arsenic, selenium, and tellurium, though lying to the right of the stairstep line, have occasionally been included as post-transition metals.

Rationale
The diminished metallic nature of the post-transition metals is largely attributable to the increase in nuclear charge going across the periodic table, from left to right.  The increase in nuclear charge is partially offset by an increasing number of electrons but as these are spatially distributed each extra electron does not fully screen each successive increase in nuclear charge, and the latter therefore dominates. With some irregularities, atomic radii contract, ionisation energies increase, fewer electrons become available for metallic bonding, and "ions [become] smaller and more polarizing and more prone to covalency." This phenomenon is more evident in period 4–6 post-transition metals, due to inefficient screening of their nuclear charges by their d10 and (in the case of the period 6 metals) f14 electron configurations; the screening power of electrons decreases in the sequence s > p > d > f. The reductions in atomic size due to the interjection of the d- and f-blocks are referred to as, respectively, the 'scandide' or 'd-block contraction', and the 'lanthanide contraction'. Relativistic effects also "increase the binding energy", and hence ionisation energy, of the electrons in "the 6s shell in gold and mercury, and the 6p shell in subsequent elements of period 6."

Descriptive chemistry
This section outlines relevant physical and chemical properties of the elements typically or sometimes classified as post-transition metals. For complete profiles, including history, production, specific uses, and biological roles and precautions, see the main article for each element. Abbreviations: MH—Mohs hardness; BCN—bulk coordination number.

Group 10

Platinum is a moderately hard metal (MH 3.5) of low mechanical strength, with a close-packed face-centred cubic structure (BCN 12). Compared to other metals in this category, it has an unusually high melting point (2042 K v 1338 for gold). Platinum is more ductile than gold, silver or copper, thus being the most ductile of pure metals, but it is less malleable than gold. Like gold, platinum is a chalcophile element in terms of its occurrence in the Earth's crust, preferring to form covalent bonds with sulfur. It behaves like a transition metal in its preferred oxidation states of +2 and +4. There is very little evidence of the existence of simple metal ions in aqueous media; most platinum compounds are (covalent) coordination complexes. The oxide (PtO2) is amphoteric, with acidic properties predominating; it can be fused with alkali hydroxides (MOH; M = Na, K) or calcium oxide (CaO) to give anionic platinates, such as red Na2PtO3 and green K2PtO3. The hydrated oxide can be dissolved in hydrochloric acid to give the hexachlormetallate(IV), H2PtCl6.

Like gold, which can form compounds containing the −1 auride ion, platinum can form compounds containing platinide ions, such as the Zintl phases BaPt, Ba3Pt2 and Ba2Pt, being the first (unambiguous) transition metal to do so.

Darmstadtium should be similar to its lighter homologue platinum. It is expected to have a close-packed body-centered cubic structure. It should be a very dense metal, with a density of 26–27 g/cm3 surpassing all stable elements. Darmstadtium chemistry is expected to be dominated by the +2 and +4 oxidation states, similar to platinum. Darmstadtium(IV) oxide (DsO2) should be amphoteric, and darmstadtium(II) oxide (DsO) basic, exactly analogous to platinum. There should also be a +6 oxidation state, similar to platinum. Darmstadtium should be a very noble metal: the standard reduction potential for the Ds2+/Ds couple is expected to be +1.7 V, more than the +1.52 V for the Au3+/Au couple.

Group 11

The group 11 metals are typically categorised as transition metals given they can form ions with incomplete d-shells. Physically, they have the relatively low melting points and high electronegativity values associated with post-transition metals. "The filled d subshell and free s electron of Cu, Ag, and Au contribute to their high electrical and thermal conductivity. Transition metals to the left of group 11 experience interactions between s electrons and the partially filled d subshell that lower electron mobility." Chemically, the group 11 metals in their +1 valence states show similarities to other post-transition metals; they are occasionally classified as such.

Copper is a soft metal (MH 2.5–3.0) with low mechanical strength. It has a close-packed face-centred cubic structure (BCN 12). Copper behaves like a transition metal in its preferred oxidation state of +2. Stable compounds in which copper is in its less preferred oxidation state of +1 (Cu2O, CuCl, CuBr, CuI and CuCN, for example) have significant covalent character. The oxide (CuO) is amphoteric, with predominating basic properties; it can be fused with alkali oxides (M2O; M = Na, K) to give anionic oxycuprates (M2CuO2). Copper forms Zintl phases such as Li7CuSi2 and M3Cu3Sb4 (M = Y, La, Ce, Pr, Nd, Sm, Gd, Tb, Dy, Ho, or Er).

Silver is a soft metal (MH 2.5–3) with low mechanical strength. It has a close-packed face-centred cubic structure (BCN 12). The chemistry of silver is dominated by its +1 valence state in which it shows generally similar physical and chemical properties to compounds of thallium, a main group metal, in the same oxidation state. It tends to bond covalently in most of its compounds. The oxide (Ag2O) is amphoteric, with basic properties predominating. Silver forms a series of oxoargentates (M3AgO2, M = Na, K, Rb).  It is a constituent of Zintl phases such as Li2AgM (M = Al, Ga, In, Tl, Si, Ge, Sn or Pb) and Yb3Ag2.

Gold is a soft metal (MH 2.5–3) that is easily deformed. It has a close-packed face-centred cubic structure (BCN 12). The chemistry of gold is dominated by its +3 valence state; all such compounds of gold feature covalent bonding, as do its stable +1 compounds. Gold oxide (Au2O3) is amphoteric, with acidic properties predominating; it forms anionic hydroxoaurates , where M = Na, K, ½Ba, Tl; and aurates such as NaAuO2. Gold is a constituent of Zintl phases such as M2AuBi (M = Li or Na); Li2AuM (M = In, Tl, Ge, Pb, Sn) and Ca5Au4.

Roentgenium is expected to be similar to its lighter homologue gold in many ways. It is expected to have a close-packed body-centered cubic structure. It should be a very dense metal, with its density of 22–24 g/cm3 being around that of osmium and iridium, the densest stable elements. Roentgenium chemistry is expected to be dominated by the +3 valence state, similarly to gold, in which it should similarly behave as a transition metal. Roentgenium oxide (Rg2O3) should be amphoteric; stable compounds in the −1, +1, and +5 valence states should also exist, exactly analogous to gold. Roentgenium is similarly expected to be a very noble metal: the standard reduction potential for the Rg3+/Rg couple is expected to be +1.9 V, more than the +1.52 V for the Au3+/Au couple. The  cation is expected to be the softest among the metal cations. Due to relativistic stabilisation of the 7s subshell, roentgenium is expected to have a full s-subshell and a partially filled d-subshell, instead of the free s-electron and full d-subshell of copper, silver, and gold.

Group 12

On the group 12 metals (zinc, cadmium and mercury), Smith observed that, "Textbook writers have always found difficulty in dealing with these elements." There is an abrupt and significant reduction in physical metallic character from group 11 to group 12. Their chemistry is that of main group elements. A 2003 survey of chemistry books showed that they were treated as either transition metals or main group elements on about a 50/50 basis. The IUPAC Red Book notes that although the group 3−12 elements are commonly referred to as the transition elements, the group 12 elements are not always included. The group 12 elements do not satisfy the IUPAC Gold Book definition of a transition metal.

Zinc is a soft metal (MH 2.5) with poor mechanical properties. It has a crystalline structure (BCN 6+6) that is slightly distorted from the ideal. Many zinc compounds are markedly covalent in character. The oxide and hydroxide of zinc in its preferred oxidation state of +2, namely ZnO and Zn(OH)2, are amphoteric; it forms anionic zincates in strongly basic solutions. Zinc forms Zintl phases such as LiZn, NaZn13 and BaZn13. Highly purified zinc, at room temperature, is ductile. It reacts with moist air to form a thin layer of carbonate that prevents further corrosion.

Cadmium is a soft, ductile metal (MH 2.0) that undergoes substantial deformation, under load, at room temperature. Like zinc, it has a crystalline structure (BCN 6+6) that is slightly distorted from the ideal. The halides of cadmium, with the exception of the fluoride, exhibit a substantially covalent nature. The oxides of cadmium in its preferred oxidation state of +2, namely CdO and Cd(OH)2, are weakly amphoteric; it forms cadmates in strongly basic solutions. Cadmium forms Zintl phases such as LiCd, RbCd13 and CsCd13. When heated in air to a few hundred degrees, cadmium represents a toxicity hazard due to the release of cadmium vapour; when heated to its boiling point in air (just above 1000 K; 725 C; 1340 F; cf steel ~2700 K; 2425 C; 4400 F), the cadmium vapour oxidizes, 'with a reddish-yellow flame, dispersing as an aerosol of potentially lethal CdO particles.' Cadmium is otherwise stable in air and in water, at ambient conditions, protected by a layer of cadmium oxide.

Mercury is a liquid at room temperature. It has the weakest metallic bonding of all, as indicated by its bonding energy (61 kJ/mol) and melting point (−39 °C) which, together, are the lowest of all the metallic elements. Solid mercury (MH 1.5) has a distorted crystalline structure, with mixed metallic-covalent bonding, and a BCN of 6. "All of the [Group 12] metals, but especially mercury, tend to form covalent rather than ionic compounds." The oxide of mercury in its preferred oxidation state (HgO; +2) is weakly amphoteric, as is the congener sulfide HgS. It forms anionic thiomercurates (such as Na2HgS2 and BaHgS3) in strongly basic solutions. It forms or is a part of Zintl phases such as NaHg and K8In10Hg. Mercury is a relatively inert metal, showing little oxide formation at room temperature.

Copernicium is expected to be a liquid at room temperature, although experiments have so far not succeeded in determining its boiling point with sufficient precision to prove this. Like its lighter congener mercury, many of its singular properties stem from its closed-shell d10s2 electron configuration as well as strong relativistic effects. Its cohesive energy is even less than that of mercury and is likely only higher than that of flerovium. Solid copernicium is expected to crystallise in a close-packed body-centred cubic structure and have a density of about 14.7 g/cm3, decreasing to 14.0 g/cm3 on melting, which is similar to that of mercury (13.534 g/cm3). Copernicium chemistry is expected to be dominated by the +2 oxidation state, in which it would behave like a post-transition metal similar to mercury, although the relativistic stabilisation of the 7s orbitals means that this oxidation state involves giving up 6d rather than 7s electrons. A concurrent relativistic destabilisation of the 6d orbitals should allow higher oxidation states such as +3 and +4 with electronegative ligands, such as the halogens. A very high standard reduction potential of +2.1 V is expected for the Cn2+/Cn couple. In fact, bulk copernicium may even be an insulator with a band gap of 6.4±0.2 V, which would make it similar to the noble gases such as radon, though copernicium has previously been predicted to be a semiconductor or a noble metal instead. Copernicium oxide (CnO) is expected to be predominantly basic.

Group 13

Aluminium sometimes is or is not counted as a post-transition metal. It has a well shielded [Ne] noble gas core rather than the less well shielded [Ar]3d10, [Kr]4d10 or [Xe]4f145d10 core of the post-transition metals. The small radius of the aluminium ion combined with its high charge make it a strongly polarizing species, prone to covalency.

Aluminium in pure form is a soft metal (MH 3.0) with low mechanical strength. It has a close-packed structure (BCN 12) showing some evidence of partially directional bonding. It has a low melting point and a high thermal conductivity. Its strength is halved at 200 °C, and for many of its alloys is minimal at 300 °C. The latter three properties of aluminium limit its use to situations where fire protection is not required, or necessitate the provision of increased fire protection. It bonds covalently in most of its compounds; has an amphoteric oxide; and can form anionic aluminates. Aluminium forms Zintl phases such as LiAl, Ca3Al2Sb6, and SrAl2. A thin protective layer of oxide confers a reasonable degree of corrosion resistance. It is susceptible to attack in low pH (<4) and high (> 8.5) pH conditions, a phenomenon that is generally more pronounced in the case of commercial purity aluminium and aluminium alloys. Given many of these properties and its proximity to the dividing line between metals and nonmetals, aluminium is occasionally classified as a metalloid. Despite its shortcomings, it has a good strength-to-weight ratio and excellent ductility; its mechanical strength can be improved considerably with the use of alloying additives; its very high thermal conductivity can be put to good use in heat sinks and heat exchangers; and it has a high electrical conductivity. At lower temperatures, aluminium increases its deformation strength (as do most materials) whilst maintaining ductility (as do face-centred cubic metals generally). Chemically, bulk aluminium is a strongly electropositive metal, with a high negative electrode potential.

Gallium is a soft, brittle metal (MH 1.5) that melts at only a few degrees above room temperature. It has an unusual crystalline structure featuring mixed metallic-covalent bonding and low symmetry (BCN 7 i.e. 1+2+2+2). It bonds covalently in most of its compounds, has an amphoteric oxide; and can form anionic gallates. Gallium forms Zintl phases such as Li2Ga7, K3Ga13 and YbGa2. It is slowly oxidized in moist air at ambient conditions; a protective film of oxide prevents further corrosion.

Indium is a soft, highly ductile metal (MH 1.0) with a low tensile strength. It has a partially distorted crystalline structure (BCN 4+8) associated with incompletely ionised atoms. The tendency of indium '...to form covalent compounds is one of the more important properties influencing its electrochemical behavior'. The oxides of indium in its preferred oxidation state of +3, namely In2O3 and In(OH)3 are weakly amphoteric; it forms anionic indates in strongly basic solutions. Indium forms Zintl phases such as LiIn, Na2In and Rb2In3. Indium does not oxidize in air at ambient conditions.

Thallium is a soft, reactive metal (MH 1.0), so much so that it has no structural uses. It has a close-packed crystalline structure (BCN 6+6) but an abnormally large interatomic distance that has been attributed to partial ionisation of the thallium atoms. Although compounds in the +1 (mostly ionic) oxidation state are the more numerous, thallium has an appreciable chemistry in the +3 (largely covalent) oxidation state, as seen in its chalcogenides and trihalides. It is the only one of the Group 13 elements to react with air at room temperature, slowly forming the amphoteric oxide Tl2O3. It forms anionic thallates such as Tl3TlO3, Na3Tl(OH)6, NaTlO2, and KTlO2, and is present as the Tl− thallide anion in the compound CsTl. Thallium forms Zintl phases, such as Na2Tl, Na2K21Tl19, CsTl and Sr5Tl3H.

Nihonium is expected to have a hexagonal close-packed crystalline structure, albeit based on extrapolation from those of the lighter group 13 elements: its density is expected to be around 16 g/cm3. A standard electrode potential of +0.6 V is predicted for the Nh+/Nh couple. The relativistic stabilisation of the 7s electrons is very high and hence nihonium should predominantly form the +1 oxidation state; nevertheless, as for copernicium, the +3 oxidation state should be reachable. Because of the shell closure at flerovium caused by spin-orbit coupling, nihonium is also one 7p electron short of a closed shell and would hence form a −1 oxidation state; in both the +1 and −1 oxidation states, nihonium should show more similarities to astatine than thallium. The Nh+ ion is expected to also have some similarities to the Ag+ ion, particularly in its propensity for complexation. Nihonium oxide (Nh2O) is expected to be amphoteric.

Group 14

Germanium is a hard (MH 6), very brittle semi-metallic element. It was originally thought to be a poorly conducting metal but has the electronic band structure of a semiconductor. Germanium is usually considered to be a metalloid rather than a metal. Like carbon (as diamond) and silicon, it has a covalent tetrahedral crystalline structure (BCN 4). Compounds in its preferred oxidation state of +4 are covalent. Germanium forms an amphoteric oxide, GeO2 and anionic germanates, such as Mg2GeO4. It forms Zintl phases such as LiGe, K8Ge44 and La4Ge3.

Tin is a soft, exceptionally weak metal (MH 1.5); a 1-cm thick rod will bend easily under mild finger pressure. It has an irregularly coordinated crystalline structure (BCN 4+2) associated with incompletely ionised atoms. All of the Group 14 elements form compounds in which they are in the +4, predominantly covalent, oxidation state; even in the +2 oxidation state tin generally forms covalent bonds.  The oxides of tin in its preferred oxidation state of +2, namely SnO and Sn(OH)2, are amphoteric; it forms stannites in strongly basic solutions. Below 13 °C (55.4 °F) tin changes its structure and becomes 'grey tin', which has the same structure as diamond, silicon and germanium (BCN 4). This transformation causes ordinary tin to crumble and disintegrate since, as well as being brittle, grey tin occupies more volume due to having a less efficient crystalline packing structure. Tin forms Zintl phases such as Na4Sn, BaSn, K8Sn25 and Ca31Sn20. It has good corrosion resistance in air on account of forming a thin protective oxide layer. Pure tin has no structural uses. It is used in lead-free solders, and as a hardening agent in alloys of other metals, such as copper, lead, titanium and zinc.

Lead is a soft metal (MH 1.5, but hardens close to melting) which, in many cases, is unable to support its own weight. It has a close-packed structure (BCN 12) but an abnormally large inter-atomic distance that has been attributed to partial ionisation of the lead atoms. It forms a semi-covalent dioxide PbO2; a covalently bonded sulfide PbS; covalently bonded halides; and a range of covalently bonded organolead compounds such as the lead(II) mercaptan , lead tetra-acetate , and the once common, anti-knock additive, tetra-ethyl lead . The oxide of lead in its preferred oxidation state (PbO; +2) is amphoteric; it forms anionic plumbates in strongly basic solutions. It has reasonable to good corrosion resistance; in moist air it forms a mixed gray coating of oxide, carbonate and sulfate that hinders further oxidation.

Flerovium is expected to be a liquid metal due to spin-orbit coupling "tearing" apart the 7p subshell, so that its 7s27p1/22 valence configuration forms a quasi-closed shell similar to those of mercury and copernicium. Solid flerovium should have a face-centered cubic structure and be a rather dense metal, with a density of around 14 g/cm3. Flerovium is expected to have a standard electrode potential of +0.9 V for the Fl2+/Fl couple. Flerovium oxide (FlO) is expected to be amphoteric, forming anionic flerovates in basic solutions.

Group 15

Arsenic is a moderately hard (MH 3.5) and brittle semi-metallic element. It is commonly regarded as a metalloid, or by some other authors as either a metal or a non-metal. It exhibits poor electrical conductivity which, like a metal, decreases with temperature. It has a relatively open and partially covalent crystalline structure (BCN 3+3). Arsenic forms covalent bonds with most other elements. The oxide in its preferred oxidation state (As2O3, +3) is amphoteric, as is the corresponding oxoacid in aqueous solution (H3AsO3) and congener sulfide (As2S3). Arsenic forms a series of anionic arsenates such as Na3AsO3 and PbHAsO4, and Zintl phases such as Na3As, Ca2As and SrAs3.

Antimony is a soft (MH 3.0) and brittle semi-metallic element. It is commonly regarded as a metalloid, or by some other authors as either a metal or a non-metal. It exhibits poor electrical conductivity which, like a metal, decreases with temperature. It has a relatively open and partially covalent crystalline structure (BCN 3+3). Antimony forms covalent bonds with most other elements. The oxide in its preferred oxidation state (Sb2O3, +3) is amphoteric. Antimony forms a series of anionic antimonites and antimonates such as NaSbO2 and AlSbO4, and Zintl phases such as K5Sb4, Sr2Sb3 and BaSb3.

Bismuth is a soft metal (MH 2.5) that is too brittle for any structural use. It has an open-packed crystalline structure (BCN 3+3) with bonding that is intermediate between metallic and covalent. For a metal, it has exceptionally low electrical and thermal conductivity. Most of the ordinary compounds of bismuth are covalent in nature. The oxide, Bi2O3 is predominantly basic but will act as a weak acid in warm, very concentrated KOH. It can also be fused with potassium hydroxide in air, resulting in a brown mass of potassium bismuthate. The solution chemistry of bismuth is characterised by the formation of oxyanions; it forms anionic bismuthates in strongly basic solutions. Bismuth forms Zintl phases such as NaBi, Rb7In4Bi6 and Ba11Cd8Bi14. Bailar et al. refer to bismuth as being, 'the least "metallic" metal in its physical properties' given its brittle nature (and possibly) 'the lowest electrical conductivity of all metals.'

Moscovium is expected to be a quite reactive metal. A standard reduction potential of −1.5 V for the Mc+/Mc couple is expected. This increased reactivity is consistent with the quasi-closed shell of flerovium and the beginning of a new series of elements with the filling of the loosely bound 7p3/2 subshell, and is rather different from the relative nobility of bismuth. Like thallium, moscovium should have a common +1 oxidation state and a less common +3 oxidation state, although their relative stabilities may change depending on the complexing ligands or the degree of hydrolysis. Moscovium(I) oxide (Mc2O) should be quite basic, like that of thallium, while moscovium(III) oxide (Mc2O3) should be amphoteric, like that of bismuth.

Group 16

Selenium is a soft (MH 2.0) and brittle semi-metallic element. It is commonly regarded as a nonmetal, but is sometimes considered a metalloid or even a heavy metal. Selenium has a hexagonal polyatomic (CN 2) crystalline structure. It is a semiconductor with a band gap of 1.7 eV, and a photoconductor meaning its electrical conductivity increases a million-fold when illuminated. Selenium forms covalent bonds with most other elements, noting it can form ionic selenides with highly electropositive metals. The common oxide of selenium (SeO3) is strongly acidic. Selenium forms a series of anionic selenites and selenates such as Na2SeO3, Na2Se2O5, and Na2SeO4, as well as Zintl phases such as Cs4Se16.

Tellurium is a soft (MH 2.25) and brittle semi-metallic element. It is commonly regarded as a metalloid, or by some authors either as a metal or a non-metal. Tellurium has a polyatomic (CN 2) hexagonal crystalline structure. It is a semiconductor with a band gap of 0.32 to 0.38 eV. Tellurium forms covalent bonds with most other elements, noting it has an extensive organometallic chemistry and that many tellurides can be regarded as metallic alloys. The common oxide of tellurium (TeO2) is amphoteric. Tellurium forms a series of anionic tellurites and tellurates such as Na2TeO3, Na6TeO6, and Rb6Te2O9 (the last containing tetrahedral  and trigonal bipyramidal  anions), as well as Zintl phases such as NaTe3.

Polonium is a radioactive, soft metal with a hardness similar to lead. It has a simple cubic crystalline structure characterised (as determined by electron density calculations) by partially directional bonding, and a BCN of 6. Such a structure ordinarily results in very low ductility and fracture resistance however polonium has been predicted to be a ductile metal. It forms a covalent hydride; its halides are covalent, volatile compounds, resembling those of tellurium. The oxide of polonium in its preferred oxidation state (PoO2; +4) is predominantly basic, but amphoteric if dissolved in concentrated aqueous alkali, or fused with potassium hydroxide in air. The yellow polonate(IV) ion  is known in aqueous solutions of low Cl‒ concentration and high pH. Polonides such as Na2Po, BePo, ZnPo, CdPo and HgPo feature Po2− anions; except for HgPo these are some of the more stable of the polonium compounds.

Livermorium is expected to be less reactive than moscovium. The standard reduction potential of the Lv2+/Lv couple is expected to be around +0.1 V. It should be most stable in the +2 oxidation state; the 7p3/2 electrons are expected to be so weakly bound that the first two ionisation potentials of livermorium should lie between those of the reactive alkaline earth metals magnesium and calcium. The +4 oxidation state should only be reachable with the most electronegative ligands. Livermorium(II) oxide (LvO) should be basic and livermorium(IV) oxide (LvO2) should be amphoteric, analogous to polonium.

Group 17

Astatine is a radioactive element that has never been seen; a visible quantity would immediately be vaporised due to its intense radioactivity. It may be possible to prevent this with sufficient cooling. Astatine is commonly regarded as a nonmetal, less commonly as a metalloid and occasionally as a metal. Unlike its lighter congener iodine, evidence for diatomic astatine is sparse and inconclusive. In 2013, on the basis of relativistic modelling, astatine was predicted to be a monatomic metal, with a face-centered cubic crystalline structure. As such, astatine could be expected to have a metallic appearance; show metallic conductivity; and have excellent ductility, even at cryogenic temperatures. It could also be expected to show significant nonmetallic character, as is normally the case for metals in, or in the vicinity of, the p-block. The hydroxide of astatine At(OH) is presumed to be amphoteric. Astatine forms covalent compounds with nonmetals, including hydrogen astatide HAt and carbon tetraastatide CAt4. At− anions have been reported to form astatides with silver, thallium, palladium and lead. Pruszyński et al. note that astatide ions should form strong complexes with soft metal cations such as Hg2+, Pd2+, Ag+ and Tl3+; they list the astatide formed with mercury as Hg(OH)At.

Tennessine, despite being in the halogen column of the periodic table, is expected to go even further towards metallicity than astatine due to its small electron affinity. The −1 state should not be important for tennessine and its major oxidation states should be +1 and +3, with +3 more stable: Ts3+ is expected to behave similarly to Au3+ in halide media. As such, tennessine oxide (Ts2O3) is expected to be amphoteric, similar to gold oxide and astatine(III) oxide.

Group 18

Oganesson is expected to be a very poor "noble gas" and may even be metallised by its large atomic radius and the weak binding of the easily removed 7p3/2 electrons: certainly it is expected to be a quite reactive element that is solid at room temperature and has some similarities to tin, as one effect of the spin–orbit splitting of the 7p subshell is a "partial role reversal" of groups 14 and 18. Due to the immense polarisability of oganesson, it is expected that not only oganesson(II) fluoride but also oganesson(IV) fluoride should be predominantly ionic, involving the formation of Og2+ and Og4+ cations. Oganesson(II) oxide (OgO) and oganesson(IV) oxide (OgO2) are both expected to be amphoteric, similar to the oxides of tin.

Aliases and related groupings

B-subgroup metals
Superficially, the B-subgroup metals are the metals in Groups IB to VIIB of the periodic table, corresponding to groups 11 to 17 using current IUPAC nomenclature. Practically, the group 11 metals (copper, silver and gold) are ordinarily regarded as transition metals (or sometimes as coinage metals, or noble metals) whereas the group 12 metals (zinc, cadmium, and mercury) may or may not be treated as B-subgroup metals depending on if the transition metals are taken to end at group 11 or group 12. The 'B' nomenclature (as in Groups IB, IIB, and so on) was superseded in 1988 but is still occasionally encountered in more recent literature.

The B-subgroup metals show nonmetallic properties; this is particularly apparent in moving from group 12 to group 16. Although the group 11 metals have normal close-packed metallic structures they show an overlap in chemical properties. In their +1 compounds (the stable state for silver; less so for copper) they are typical B-subgroup metals. In their +2 and +3 states their chemistry is typical of transition metal compounds.

Pseudo metals and hybrid metals
The B-subgroup metals can be subdivided into pseudo metals and hybrid metals. The pseudo metals (groups 12 and 13, including boron) are said to behave more like true metals (groups 1 to 11) than non-metals. The hybrid metals As, Sb, Bi, Te, Po, At — which other authors would call metalloids — partake about equally the properties of both. The pseudo metals can be considered related to the hybrid metals through the group 14 carbon column.

Base metals
Mingos writes that while the p-block metals are typical, that are not strongly reducing and that, as such, they are base metals requiring oxidizing acids to dissolve them.

Borderline metals
Parish writes that, 'as anticipated', the borderline metals of groups 13 and 14 have non-standard structures. Gallium, indium, thallium, germanium, and tin are specifically mentioned in this context. The group 12 metals are also noted as having slightly distorted structures; this has been interpreted as evidence of weak directional (i.e. covalent) bonding.

Chemically weak metals
Rayner-Canham and Overton use the term chemically weak metals to refer to the metals close to the metal-nonmetal borderline. These metals behave chemically more like the metalloids, particularly with respect to anionic species formation. The nine chemically weak metals identified by them are beryllium, magnesium, aluminium, gallium, tin, lead, antimony, bismuth, and polonium.

Frontier metals
Vernon  uses the term "frontier metal" to refer to the class of chemically weak metals adjacent to the dividing line between metals. He notes that several of them "are further distinguished by a series of…knight's move relationships, formed between one element and the element one period down and two groups to its right." For example, copper(I) chemistry resembles indium(I) chemistry: "both ions are found mostly in solid-state compounds such as CuCl and InCl; the fluorides are unknown for both ions while the iodides are the most stable." The name frontier metal is adapted from Russell and Lee, who wrote that, "…bismuth and group 16 element polonium are generally considered to be metals, although they occupy 'frontier territory' on the periodic table, adjacent to the nonmetals."

Fusible metals
Cardarelli, writing in 2008, categorizes zinc, cadmium, mercury, gallium, indium, thallium, tin, lead, antimony and bismuth as fusible metals. Nearly 100 years earlier, Louis (1911) noted that fusible metals were alloys containing tin, cadmium, lead, and bismuth in various proportions, "the tin ranging from 10 to 20%."

Heavy metals (of low melting point)
Van Wert grouped the periodic table metals into a. the light metals; b. the heavy brittle metals of high melting point, c. the heavy ductile metals of high melting point; d. the heavy metals of low melting point (Zn, Cd, Hg; Ga, In, Tl; Ge, Sn; As, Sb, Bi; and Po), and e. the strong, electropositive metals. Britton, Abbatiello and Robins speak of 'the soft, low melting point, heavy metals in columns lIB, IlIA, IVA, and VA of the periodic table, namely Zn, Cd, Hg; Al, Ga, In, Tl; [Si], Ge, Sn, Pb; and Bi. The Sargent-Welch Chart of the Elements groups the metals into: light metals, the lanthanide series; the actinide series; heavy metals (brittle); heavy metals (ductile); and heavy metals (low melting point): Zn, Cd, Hg, [Cn]; Al, Ga, In, Tl; Ge, Sn, Pb, [Fl]; Sb, Bi; and Po.

Less typical metals
Habashi groups the elements into eight major categories: [1] typical metals (alkali metals, alkaline earth metals, and aluminium); [2] lanthanides (Ce–Lu); [3] actinides (Th–Lr); [4] transition metals (Sc, Y, La, Ac, groups 4–10); [5] less typical metals (groups 11–12, Ga, In, Tl, Sn and Pb); [6] metalloids (B, Si, Ge, As, Se, Sb, Te, Bi and Po); [7] covalent nonmetals (H, C, N, O, P, S and the halogens); and [8] monatomic nonmetals (that is, the noble gases).

Metametals
The metametals are zinc, cadmium, mercury, indium, thallium, tin and lead. They are ductile elements but, compared to their metallic periodic table neighbours to the left, have lower melting points, relatively low electrical and thermal conductivities, and show distortions from close-packed forms. Sometimes beryllium and gallium are included as metametals despite having low ductility.

Ordinary metals
Abrikosov distinguishes between ordinary metals, and transition metals where the inner shells are not filled. The ordinary metals have lower melting points and cohesive energies than those of the transition metals. Gray identifies as ordinary metals: aluminium, gallium, indium, thallium, nihonium, tin, lead, flerovium, bismuth, moscovium, and livermorium. He adds that, 'in reality most of the metals that people think of as ordinary are in fact transition metals...'.

Other metals
As noted, the metals falling between the transition metals and the metalloids on the periodic table are sometimes called other metals (see also, for example, Taylor et al.). 'Other' in this sense has the related meanings of, 'existing besides, or distinct from, that already mentioned' (that is, the alkali and alkaline earth metals, the lanthanides and actinides, and the transition metals); 'auxiliary'; 'ancillary, secondary'. According to Gray there should be a better name for these elements than 'other metals'.

p-block metals
The p-block metals are the metals in groups 13‒16 of the periodic table. Usually, this includes aluminium, gallium, indium and thallium; tin and lead; and bismuth. Germanium, antimony and polonium are sometimes also included, although the first two are commonly recognised as metalloids. The p-block metals tend to have structures that display low coordination numbers and directional bonding. Pronounced covalency is found in their compounds; the majority of their oxides are amphoteric.

Aluminium is an undisputed p-block element by group membership and its [Ne] 3s2 3p1 electron configuration, but aluminium does not literally come after transition metals unlike p-block metals from period 4 and on. The epithet "post-transition" in reference to aluminium is a misnomer, and aluminium normally has no d electrons unlike all other p-block metals.

Peculiar metals
Slater divides the metals 'fairly definitely, though not perfectly sharply' into the ordinary metals and the peculiar metals, the latter of which verge on the nonmetals. The peculiar metals occur towards the ends of the rows of the periodic table and include 'approximately:' gallium, indium, and thallium; carbon, silicon '(both of which have some metallic properties, though we have previously treated them as nonmetals),' germanium and tin; arsenic, antimony, and bismuth; and selenium '(which is partly metallic)' and tellurium. The ordinary metals have centro-symmetrical crystalline structures whereas the peculiar metals have structures involving directional bonding. More recently, Joshua observed that the peculiar metals have mixed metallic-covalent bonding.

Poor metals
Farrell and Van Sicien use the term poor metal, for simplicity, 'to denote one with a significant covalent, or directional character.' Hill and Holman observe that, 'The term poor metals is not widely used, but it is a useful description for several metals including tin, lead and bismuth. These metals fall in a triangular block of the periodic table to the right of the transition metals. They are usually low in the activity (electrochemical) series and they have some resemblances to non-metals.' Reid et al. write that 'poor metals' is, '[A]n older term for metallic elements in Groups 13‒15 of the periodic table that are softer and have lower melting points than the metals traditionally used for tools.'

Post-transition metals
An early usage of this name is recorded by Deming, in 1940, in his well-known book Fundamental Chemistry. He treated the transition metals as finishing at group 10 (nickel, palladium and platinum). He referred to the ensuing elements in periods 4 to 6 of the periodic table (copper to germanium; silver to antimony; gold to polonium)—in view of their underlying d10 electronic configurations—as post-transition metals.

Semimetals
In modern use, the term 'semimetal' sometimes refers, loosely or explicitly, to metals with incomplete metallic character in crystalline structure, electrical conductivity or electronic structure. Examples include gallium, ytterbium, bismuth, mercury and neptunium. Metalloids, which are in-between elements that are neither metals nor nonmetals, are also sometimes instead called semimetals. The elements commonly recognised as metalloids are boron, silicon, germanium, arsenic, antimony and tellurium. In old chemistry, before the publication in 1789 of Lavoisier's 'revolutionary' Elementary Treatise on Chemistry, a semimetal was a metallic element with 'very imperfect ductility and malleability' such as zinc, mercury or bismuth.

Soft metals
Scott and Kanda refer to the metals in groups 11 to 15, plus platinum in group 10, as soft metals, excluding the very active metals, in groups 1−3. They note many important non-ferrous alloys are made from metals in this class, including sterling silver, brass (copper and zinc), and bronzes (copper with tin, manganese and nickel).

Transition metals
Historically, the transition metal series "includes those elements of the Periodic Table which 'bridge the gap' between the very electropositive alkali and allkaline earth metals and the electronegative non-metals of the groups: nitrogen-phosphorus, oxygen-sulfur, and the halogens." Cheronis, Parsons and Ronneberg wrote that, "The transition metals of low melting point form a block in the Periodic Table: those of Groups II 'b' [zinc, cadmium, mercury], III 'b' [aluminium, gallium, indium, thallium], and germanium, tin and lead in Group IV. These metals all have melting points below 425 °C."

Notes

Sources

Citations 

Indexed references 

 Abd-El-Aziz AS, Carraher CE, Pittman CU, Sheats JE & Zeldin M 2003, Macromolecules Containing Metal and Metal-Like Elements, vol. 1, A Half-Century of Metal- and Metalloid-Containing Polymers, John Wiley & Sons, Hoboken, New Jersey, 
 Abrikosov AA 1988, Fundamentals of the theory of metals, North Holland, Amsterdam, 
 Aleandri LE & Bogdanović B 2008, 'The magnesium route to active metals and intermetallics, in A Fürstner (ed.), Active metals: Preparation, characterization, applications, VCH Verlagsgesellschalt, Weinheim, pp. 299‒338
 Alhassan SJ & Goodwin FE 2005, Lead and Alloys, in R Baboian (ed), 'Corrosion Tests and Standards: Application and Interpretation,' 2nd ed., ASTM International, West Conshohocken, PA, pp. 531–6, 
 Arndt N & Ganino C 2012, Metals and Society: An Introduction to Economic Geology, Springer-Verlag, Berlin, 
 Atkins P, Overton T, Rourke J, Weller M & Armstrong F 2006, Shriver & Atkins inorganic chemistry, 4th ed., Oxford University Press, Oxford, 
 Atkins P & de Paula J 2011, Physical Chemistry for the Life Sciences, 2nd ed., Oxford University, Oxford, 
 Aylward G & Findlay T 2008, SI chemical data, 6th ed., John Wiley, Milton, Queensland, 
 Bagnall KW 1962, 'The chemistry of polonium,' in HHJ Emeleus & AG Sharpe (eds), Advances in inorganic chemistry and radiochemistry, vol. 4, Academic Press, New York, pp. 197‒230
 Bagnall KW 1966, The chemistry of selenium, tellurium and polonium, Elsevier, Amsterdam
 Bailar JC, Moeller T, Kleinberg J, Guss CO, Castellion ME & Metz C 1984, Chemistry, 2nd ed., Academic Press, Orlando, 
 Banthorpe DV, Gatford C & Hollebone BR 1968, 'Gas Chromatographic Separation of Olefins and Aromatic Hydrocarbons Using Thallium(I)-Nitrate: Glycol as Stationary Phase', Journal of Gas Chromatography, vol. 6, no. 1, pp.  61–62, 
 Bashilova NI & Khomutova, TV 1984, 'Thallates of alkali metals and monovalent thallium formed in aqueous solutions of their hydroxides', Russian Chemical Bulletin, vol. 33, no. 8, August, pp. 1543–47
 Benbow EM 2008, From paramagnetism to spin glasses: Magnetic studies of single crystal intermetallics, PhD dissertation, Florida State University
 Berei K & Vasáros L 1985 'General aspects of the chemistry of astatine', pp. 183–209, in Kugler & Keller
 Bharara MS & Atwood, DA 2005, 'Lead: Inorganic chemistry', Encyclopedia of inorganic chemistry, RB King (ed.), 2nd ed., John Wiley & Sons, New York, 
 Beamer WH & Maxwell CR 1946, Physical properties and crystal structure of polonium, Los Alamos Scientific Laboratory, Oak Ridge, Tennessee
 Bobev S & Sevov SC 2002, 'Five ternary Zintl phases in the systems alkali-metal–indium–bismuth', Journal of Solid State Chemistry, vol. 163, no. 2, pp. 436–448, 
 Borsai, M 2005, 'Cadmium: Inorganic & coordination chemistry', in RB King (ed.), Encyclopedia of inorganic chemistry, 2nd ed., vol. 2, John Wiley & Sons, New York, pp. 603–19, 
 Braunović M 2000, 'Power Connectors', in PG Slade (ed.), Electrical Contacts: Principles and Applications, 2nd ed., CRC Press, Boca Raton, Florida, pp. 231–374, 
 Britton RB, Abbatiello FJ & Robins KE 1972, 'Flux pumps and superconducting components, in Y Winterbottom (ed.), Proceedings of the 4th International Conference on Magnetic Technology, 19‒22 September 1972, Upton, New York, Atomic Energy Commission, Washington DC, pp. 703‒708
 Brown TE, LeMay HE, Bursten BE, Woodward P & Murphy C 2012, Chemistry: The Central Science, 12th ed., Pearson Education, Glenview, Illinois, 
 Busev, AI 1962, The analytical chemistry of indium, Pergamon, Oxford
 Cardarelli F 2008, Materials handbook: A concise desktop reference, 2nd ed., Springer-Verlag, Berlin, 
 Chambers C & Holliday AK 1975, Modern inorganic chemistry: An intermediate text, Butterworths, London, 
 Chandler H 1998, Metallurgy for the non-metallurgist, ASM International, Materials Park, Ohio, 
 Charles JA, Crane FAA & Furness JAG 1997, Selection and use of Engineering Materials, 3rd ed., Butterworth-Heinemann, Oxford, 
 Cheemalapati K, Keleher J & Li Y 2008 'Key chemical components in metal CMP slurries', in Y Li (ed.), Microelectronic Applications of Chemical Mechanical Planarization, John Wiley & Sons, Hoboken, New Jersey, pp. 201–248, 
 Cheronis ND, Parsons JB & Ronneberg CE 1942, The study of the physical world, Houghton Mifflin Company, Boston
 Clegg AG & Dovaston NG 2003, 'Conductors and superconductors', in MA Laughton & DF Warne, Electrical engineer's reference book, 16th ed., Elsevier Science, Oxford, pp. 5/1–13, 
 Cobb F 2009, Structural engineer's pocket book, 2nd ed., Elsevier, Oxford, 
 Collings EW 1986, Applied Superconductivity, Metallurgy, and Physics of Titanium alloys, vol. 1, Plenum Press, New York, 
 Cooney RPJ & Hall JR 1966, 'Raman spectrum of thiomercurate(II) ion,' Australian Journal of Chemistry, vol. 19, pp. 2179–2180
 Cooper DG 1968, The periodic table, 4th ed., Butterworths, London
 Corbett JD 1996, 'Zintl phases of the early p-block elements', in SM Kauzlarich (ed.), Chemistry, structure and bonding of Zintl phases and ions, VCH, New York, pp. 139‒182
 Cotton FA, Wilkinson G, Murillo CA & Bochmann M 1999, Advanced inorganic chemistry, 6th ed., John Wiley & Sons, New York, 
 Cox PA 2004, Inorganic chemistry, 2nd ed., Instant notes series, Bios Scientific, London, 
 Cramer SD & Covino BS 2006, Corrosion: environments and industries, ASM Handbook, vol. 13C, ASM International, Metals Park, Ohio, 
 Cremer HW, Davies TR, Watkins SB 1965, Chemical Engineering Practice, vol. 8, 'Chemical kinetics,' Butterworths Scientific Publications, London
 Crichton R 2012, Biological inorganic chemistry: A new introduction to molecular structure and function, 2nd ed., Elsevier, Amsterdam, 
 Darriet B, Devalette M & Lecart B 1977, 'Determination de la structure cristalline de K3AgO2', Revue de chimie minérale, vol. 14, no. 5, pp. 423–428
 Dennis JK & Such TE 1993, Nickel and chromium plating, 3rd ed, Woodhead Publishing, Abington, Cambridge, 
 Darken L & Gurry R 1953, Physical chemistry of metals, international student edition, McGraw-Hill Book Company, New York
 Dávila ME, Molotov SL, Laubschat C & Asensio MC 2002, 'Structural determination of Yb single-crystal films grown on W(110) using photoelectron diffraction', Physical Review B, vol. 66, no. 3, p. 035411–18, 
 Davis JR (ed.) 1999, 'Galvanic, deposition, and stray-current deposition', Corrosion of aluminum and aluminum alloys, ASM International, Metals Park, Ohio, pp. 75–84, 
 Deiseroth H-J 2008, 'Discrete and extended metal clusters in alloys with mercury and other Group 12 elements', in M Driess & H Nöth (eds), Molecular clusters of the main group elements, Wiley-VCH, Chichester, pp. 169‒187, 
 Deming HG 1940, Fundamental Chemistry, John Wiley & Sons, New York
 Dillard CR & Goldberg DE 1971, Chemistry: Reactions, Structure, and Properties, Macmillan, New York
 Dirkse, TP (ed.) 1986, Copper, silver, gold and zinc, cadmium, mercury oxides and hydroxides, IUPAC solubility data series, vol. 23, Pergamon, Oxford, 
 Divakar C, Mohan M & Singh AK 1984, 'The kinetics of pressure-induced fcc-bcc transformation in ytterbium', Journal of Applied Physics, vol. 56, no. 8, pp. 2337–40, 
 Donohue J 1982, The structures of the elements, Robert E. Krieger, Malabar, Florida, 
 Driess M & Nöth H 2004, Molecular clusters of the main group elements, Wiley-VCH, Weinheim
 Dunlap BD, Brodsky MB, Shenoy GK & Kalvius GM 1970, 'Hyperfine interactions and anisotropic lattice vibrations of 237Np in α-Np metal', Physical Review B, vol. 1, no. 1, pp. 44–49, 
 Durrant PJ & Durrant B 1970, Introduction to advanced inorganic chemistry, 2nd ed., Longman
 Dwight J 1999, Aluminium design and construction, E & FN Spon, London, 
 Eagleson M 1994, Concise encyclopedia chemistry, Walter de Gruyter, Berlin, 
 Eason R 2007, Pulsed laser deposition of thin films: applications-led growth of functional materials, Wiley-Interscience, New York
 Eberle SH 1985, 'Chemical Behavior and Compounds of Astatine', pp. 183–209, in Kugler & Keller
 Emsley J 2011, Nature's Building Blocks: An A–Z guide to the Elements], new edition, Oxford University Press, Oxford, 
 Eranna G 2012, Metal oxide nanostructures as gas sensing devices, CRC Press, Boca Raton, Florida, 
 Evans RC 1966, An introduction to crystal chemistry, 2nd (corrected) edition, Cambridge University Press, London
 Evers J 2011, 'High pressure investigations on AIBIII Zintl compounds (AI = Li to Cs; BIII = Al to Tl) up to 30 GPa', in TF Fässler (ed.), Zintl phases: Principles and recent developments, Springer-Verlag, Berlin, pp. 57‒96, 
 Farrell HH & Van Sicien CD 2007, 'Binding energy, vapor pressure, and melting point of semiconductor nanoparticles', Journal of Vacuum Science Technology B, vol. 25, no. 4, pp. 1441–47, 
 Fine LW 1978, Chemistry, 2nd ed., The Wilkins & Wilkins Company. Baltimore, 
 Fishcher-Bünher J 2010, 'Metallurgy of Gold' in C Corti & R Holliday (eds), Gold: Science and Applications, CRC Press, Boca Raton, pp. 123–160, 
 Geffner SL 1969, 'Teaching the transition elements', letter, Journal of Chemical Education, vol. 46, no. 5, p. 329, 
 Gerard G & King WR 1968, 'Aluminum', in CA Hampel (ed.), The encyclopedia of the chemical elements, Reinhold, New York
 Gladyshev VP & Kovaleva SV 1998, 'Liquidus shape of the mercury–gallium system', Russian Journal of Inorganic Chemistry, vol. 43, no. 9, pp. 1445–
 Glaeser WA 1992, Materials for tribology, Elsevier Science, Amsterdam, 
 Goffer Z 2007, Archaeological Chemistry, 2nd ed., John Wiley & Sons, Hoboken, New Jersey, 
 Goodwin F, Guruswamy S, Kainer KU, Kammer C, Knabl W, Koethe A, Leichtfreid G, Schlamp G, Stickler R & Warlimont H 2005, 'Noble metals and noble metal alloys', in Springer Handbook of Condensed Matter and Materials Data, W Martienssen & H Warlimont (eds), Springer, Berlin, pp. 329–406, 
 Gray T 2009, The elements: A visual exploration of every known atom in the universe, Black Dog & Leventhal, New York, 
 Gray T 2010, 'Other Metals (11)', viewed 27 September 2013
 Greenwood NN & Earnshaw A 1998, Chemistry of the elements, 2nd ed., Butterworth-Heinemann, 
 Gupta CK 2002, Chemical metallurgy: Principles and practice, Wiley-VCH, Weinheim, 
 Gupta U 2010, Design and characterization of post-transition, main-group, heteroatomic clusters using mass spectrometry, anion photoelectron spectroscopy and velocity map imaging, PhD dissertation, Pennsylvania State University
 Habashi F 2010, 'Metals: Typical and less typical, transition and less typical', Foundations of Chemistry, vol. 12, pp. 31–39, 
 Halford GR 2006, Fatigue and durability of structural materials, ASM International, Materials Park, Ohio, 
 Haller EE 2006, 'Germanium: From its Discovery to SiGe Devices', Materials Science in Semiconductor Processing, vol. 9, nos 4–5, viewed 8 February 2013
 Harding C, Johnson DA & Janes R 2002, Elements of the p Block, Royal Society of Chemistry, Cambridge, 
 Harrington RH 1946, The modern metallurgy of alloys, John Wiley & Sons, New York
 Häussermann U 2008, 'Coexistence of hydrogen and polyanions in multinary main group element hydrides', Zeitschrift für Kristallographie - Crystalline Materials, vol. 223, no. 10, pp. 628–635, 
 Hawkes SJ 1997, 'What is a "Heavy Metal"?', Journal of Chemical Education, vol. 74, no. 11, p, 1374, 
 Hawkes SJ 1999, 'Polonium and Astatine are not Semimetals', Chem 13 News, February, p. 14, 
 Hawkes SJ 2010, 'Polonium and Astatine are not Semimetals', Journal of Chemical Education, vol. 87, no. 8, p. 783, 
 Henderson M 2000, Main group chemistry, The Royal Society of Chemistry, Cambridge, 
 Hermann A, Hoffmann R & Ashcroft NW 2013, 'Condensed Astatine: Monatomic and Metallic', Physical Review Letters, vol. 111, pp. 11604–1−11604-5, 
 Hill G & Holman J 2000, Chemistry in context, 5th ed., Nelson Thornes, Cheltenham, 
 Hindman JC 1968, 'Neptunium', in CA Hampel (ed.), The encyclopedia of the chemical elements, Reinhold, New York, pp. 432–7
 Hinton H & Dobrota N 1978, 'Density gradient centrifugation', in TS Work & E Work (eds), Laboratory techniques in biochemistry and molecular biology, vol. 6, Elsevier/North-Holland Biomedical Press, Amsterdam, pp. 1–290, 
 Hoffman P 2004, Semimetal surfaces, viewed 17 September 2013.
 Holl HA 1989, 'Materials for warship applications – past, present and future', in R Bufton & P Yakimiuk (eds), Past, present and future engineering in the Royal Navy, the Institute of Marine Engineers centenary year conference proceedings, RNEC Manadon, Plymouth, 6‒8 September 1989, Marine Management (Holdings) for the Institute of Marine Engineers, London, pp. 87–96, 
 Holman J & Stone P 2001, Chemistry, 2nd ed., Nelson Thornes, Walton on Thames, 
 Holt, Rinehart & Wilson c. 2007 'Why Polonium and Astatine are not Metalloids in HRW texts', viewed 14 October 2014
 Howe, HE 1968, 'Bismuth' in CA Hampel (ed.), The encyclopedia of the chemical elements, Reinhold, New York, pp. 56–65
 Howe, HE 1968a, 'Thallium' in CA Hampel (ed.), The encyclopedia of the chemical elements, Reinhold, New York, pp. 706–711
 Huheey JE & Huheey CL 1972, 'Anomalous properties of elements that follow "long periods" of elements', Journal of Chemical Education, vol. 49, no. 4, pp. 227–230, 
 Huheey JE, Keiter EA & Keiter RL 1993, Principles of Structure & Reactivity, 4th ed., HarperCollins College Publishers, 
 Hurd MK 1965, Formwork for concrete, 7th ed, American Concrete Institute, Farmington Hills, Michigan, 
 Hutchinson E 1964, Chemistry: The elements and their reactions, 2nd ed., W B Saunders Company, Philadelphia
 IUPAC 2005, Nomenclature of inorganic chemistry (the "Red Book"), NG Connelly & T Damhus eds, RSC Publishing, Cambridge, 
 IUPAC 2006–, Compendium of chemical terminology (the "Gold Book"), 2nd ed., by M Nic, J Jirat & B Kosata, with updates compiled by A Jenkins, 
 Ivanov-Emin BN, Nisel'son LA & Greksa, Y 1960, 'Solubility of indium hydroxide in solution of sodium hydroxide', Russian Journal of Inorganic Chemistry, vol. 5, pp. 1996–8, in WC Sheets, E Mugnier, A Barnabé, TJ Marks & KR Poeppelmeier 2006, 'Hydrothermal synthesis of delafossite-type oxides', Chemistry of Materials, vol. 18, pp. 7–20 (15), 
 Jensen WB 2003, 'The place of zinc, cadmium and mercury in the periodic table,' Journal of Chemical Education, vol. 80, no. 8, pp. 952‒61, 
 Jensen WB 2008, 'Is mercury now a transition element?', Journal of Chemical Education, vol. 85, no. 9, pp. 1182‒1183, 
 Jezequel G & Thomas J 1997, 'Experimental band structure of semimetal bismuth', Physical Review B, vol. 56, no. 11, pp. 6620–6, 
 Johansen G & Mackintosh AR 1970, 'Electronic structure and phase transitions in ytterbium', Solid State Communications, vol. 8, no. 2, pp. 121–4
 Johnson O 1970, 'Role of f electrons in chemical binding", Journal of Chemical Education, vol. 47, no. 6, pp. 431–2, 
 Joshua SJ 1991, Symmetry principles and magnetic symmetry in solid state physics, Andrew Hilger, Bristol, 
 Karpov A, Konuma M, and Jansen M 2006, 'An experimental proof for negative oxidation states of platinum: ESCA-measurements on barium platinides', Chemical Communications, vol. 8, 838–840, 
 Kauzlarich SM 2005, 'Zintl compounds' in RB King (ed.), Encyclopedia of inorganic chemistry, vol. 8, John Wiley & Sons, Chichester, pp. 6006–14, 
 Kauzlarich SM, Payne AC & Webb DJ 2002, 'Magnetism and magnetotransport properties of transition metal zintl isotypes', in JS Miller & M Drillon (eds), Magnetism: Molecules to Materials III, Wiley-VCH, Weinheim, pp. 37–62, 
 Kent A 1993, Experimental low temperature physics, American Institute of Physics, New York, 
 King RB 1995, Chemistry of the main group elements, VCH Publishers, New York, 
 King RB 1997, 'Applications of topology and graph theory in understanding inorganic molecules', in AT Babalan (ed), From chemical topology to three-dimensional geometry, Kluwer Academic / Plenum Publishers, New York, pp. 343–414
 King RB 2004, 'The metallurgist's periodic table and the Zintl-Klemm concept', in DH Rouvray DH & RB King (eds), The periodic table: into the 21st century, Institute of Physics Publishing, Philadelphia, pp. 189–206.
 King RB & Schleyer R 2004, 'Theory and concepts in main-group cluster chemistry', in M Driess and H Nöth (eds), Molecular clusters of the main group elements, Wiley-VCH, Chichester, pp. 1–33, 
 Klassen H & Hoppe R 1982, 'Alkalioxoargentate(I). Über Na3AgO2', Zeitschrift für anorganische und allgemeine Chemie, vol. 485, no. 1,  pp. 92–100, 
 Klemm W 1950, 'Einige probleme aus der physik und der chemie der halbmetalle und der metametalle', Angewandte Chemie, vol. 62, no. 6, pp. 133–42
 Kneen WR, Rogers MJW & Simpson P 1972, Chemistry: Facts, Patterns, and Principles, Addison-Wesley, London, 
 Kneip R 1996, 'Eduard Zintl: His life and scholarly work' in SM Kauzlarich (ed.), Chemistry, structure and bonding of zintl phases and ions, VCH, New York, pp. xvi–xxx, 
 Köhler J & Whangbo M-H 2008, 'Electronic Structure Study of the [Ag−Ag]4−, [Au−Au]4−, and [Hg−Hg]2− Zintl Anions in the Intermetallic Compounds Yb3Ag2, Ca5Au4, and Ca3Hg2: Transition Metal Anions As p-Metal Elements', Chemistry of Materials, vol. 20, no. 8, pp. 2751–2756, 
 Kugler HK & Keller C (eds) 1985, Gmelin Handbook of Inorganic and Organometallic chemistry, 8th ed., 'At, Astatine', system no. 8a, Springer-Verlag, Berlin, 
 Larson P, Mahanti SD, Salvador J & Kanatzidis MG 2006, 'Electronic Structure of the Ternary Zintl-phase Compounds Zr3Ni3Sb4, Hf3Ni3Sb4, and Zr3Pt3Sb4 and Their Similarity to Half-Heusler Compounds Such as ZrNiSn', Physical Review B, vol. 74, pp. 035111–1–035111-8
 Legut D, Friák M & Šob M 2010, 'Phase stability, elasticity, and theoretical strength of polonium from first principles,' Physical Review B, vol. 81, pp. 214118–1 to 19, 
 Leman JT & Barron AR 2005, 'Indium: Inorganic chemistry', Encyclopedia of Inorganic Chemistry, RB King (ed.), 2nd ed., Wiley, pp. 1526–1531
 Liang SC, King RA & White CET 1968, 'Indium', in CA Hampel (ed.), The encyclopedia of the chemical elements, Reinhold, New York, pp. 283–290
 Lidin RA 1996, Inorganic substances handbook, begell house, New York, 
 Liptrot FJ 2001, 'Overhead lines', in HM Ryan (ed.), High voltage electrical engineering and testing, 2nd ed., The Institute of Electrical Engineers, London, pp. 167‒211, 
 Lister, T 1998, Industrial chemistry case studies: Industrial processes in the 1990s, The Royal Society of Chemistry, London, 
 Liu H, Knowles CR & Chang LLY 1995, 'Extent of solid solution in Pb-Sn and Sb-Bi chalcogenides', The Canadian Mineralogist, vol.33, pp. 115–128
 Louis H 1911, Metallurgy of tin, McGraw-Hill Book Company, New York
 Lyons A 2007, Materials for architects & builders, 3rd ed., Elsevier, Oxford, 
 Mackay KM & Mackay RA 1989, Introduction to modern inorganic chemistry, 4th ed., Blackie, Glasgow, 
 Mason J 1988, 'Periodic contractions among the elements: Or, on being the right size', Journal of Chemical Education, vol. 65, no. 1, pp. 17–20, 
 Massalski TB (ed.) 1986, Noble metal alloys: phase diagrams, alloy phase stability, thermodynamic aspects, properties and special features, proceedings of the TMS Alloy Phase Committee, the TMS Thermodynamics Committee, and the American Society for Metals Alloy Phase Diagram Data Committee, held at the Metallurgical Society of AIME Annual Meeting, February 24‒28, 1985, The Society, Warrendale, Portland, 
 Massey AG 2000, Main group chemistry, 2nd ed, John Wiley & Sons, Chichester, 
 Masterton W, Hurley C & Neth E 2011, Chemistry: Principles and Reactions, 7th ed., Brooks/Cole, Belmont, California, 
 McQuarrie DA, Rock PA & Gallogly EB 2010, 'Interchapter 1: The main group metals', General chemistry, 4th ed., University Science Books, Mill Valley, California, 
 Merinis J, Legoux G & Bouissières G 1972, "Etude de la formation en phase gazeuse de composés interhalogénés d'astate par thermochromatographie" [Study of the gas-phase formation of interhalogen compounds of astatine by thermochromatography], Radiochemical and Radioanalytical Letters (in French), vol. 11, no. 1, pp. 59–64
 Messler RW 2011, Integral mechanical attachment: A resurgence of the oldest method of joining, Elsevier, Burlington, Massachusetts, 
 Messler RW & Messler RW Jr 2011, The Essence of Materials for Engineers, Jones & Bartlett Learning, Sudbury, Massachusetts, 
 Miller GJ, Lee C & Choe W 2002, 'Structure and bonding around the Zintl border', in G Meyer, D Naumann & L Wesermann (eds), Inorganic chemistry highlights, Wiley-VCH, Weinheim, pp. 21–53, 
 Miller GJ, Schmidt MW, Wang F & You T-S 2011, 'Quantitative Advances in the Zintl-Klemm Formalism,' in TF Fässler (ed), Zintl Phases: Principles and Recent Developments, Springer-Verlag, Berlin, pp. 1 56, 
 Mingos DMP 1998, Essential trends in inorganic chemistry, Oxford University Press, Oxford, 
 Mittemeijer EJ 2010, Fundamentals of materials science: The microstructure–property relationship using metals as model systems, Springer-Verlag, Berlin, 
 Moeller T 1952, Inorganic chemistry: An advanced textbook, John Wiley & Sons, New York
 Moody B 1991, Comparative Inorganic Chemistry, 3rd ed., Edward Arnold, London, 
 Müller M 1992, Inorganic structural chemistry, 2nd ed., John Wiley & Sons, Chichester, 
 Murray J 1809, A system of chemistry, 2nd ed., vol. 3, Longman, Hurst, Rees and Orme; and John Murray, London
 Noble IG 1985, 'Structural fire protection of cargo ships and guidance on the requirements of the Merchant Shipping (Fire Protection) Regulations 1984', discussion, in Ship fires in the 1980s, Tuesday 3 and Wednesday 4 December 1985 at the Institute of Marine Engineers, pp. 20–22, Marine Management (Holdings), London, c1986, 
 Norman NC 1997, Periodicity and the s- and p-block elements, Oxford University, Oxford, 
 Ogata S, Li J & Yip S 2002, 'Ideal pure shear strength of aluminium and copper', Science, vol. 298, no. 5594, 25 October, pp. 807–10, 
 Oxford English Dictionary 1989, 2nd ed., Oxford University, Oxford, 
 Parish RV 1977, The metallic elements, Longman, London, 
 Pashaey BP & Seleznev VV 1973, 'Magnetic susceptibility of gallium-indium alloys in liquid state', Russian Physics Journal, vol. 16, no. 4, pp. 565–6, 
 Patnaik, P 2003, Handbook of inorganic chemicals, McGraw-Hill, New York, 
 Pauling L 1988, General chemistry, Dover Publications, New York, 
 Petrii OA 2012, 'Chemistry, electrochemistry and electrochemical applications', in J Garche, C Dyer, P Moseley, Z Ogumi, D Rand & B Scrosati (eds), Encyclopedia of electrochemica power sources, Elsevier B.V., Amsterdam, 
 Phillips CSG & Williams RJP 1965, Inorganic chemistry, II: Metals, Clarendon Press, Oxford
 Pimpentel GC & Spratley RD 1971, Understanding chemistry, Holden-Day, San Francisco
 Polmear I 2006, Light alloys: From traditional alloys to nanocrystals, 4th ed., Elsevier, Oxford, 
 Poole CP 2004, Encyclopedic dictionary of condensed matter physics, vol. 1 A–M, trans. from Translated from the original Russian ed., published National Academy of Sciences of Ukraine, 1996–1998, Elsevier, Amsterdam, 
 Pruszyński M, Bilewicz A, Wąs B & Petelenz B 2006, 'Formation and stability of astatide-mercury complexes', Journal of Radioanalytical and Nuclear Chemistry, vol. 268, no. 1, pp. 91–94, 
 Ramroth WT 2006, Thermo-mechanical structural modelling of FRP composite sandwich panels exposed to fire, PhD thesis, University of California, San Diego, 
 Rankin WJ 2011, Minerals, metals and sustainability: Meeting future material needs, CSIRO Publishing, Collingwood, 
 Rayner-Canham G & Overton T 2006, Descriptive inorganic chemistry, 4th ed., WH Freeman, New York, 
 Reid D, Groves G, Price C & Tennant I 2011, Science for the New Zealand curriculum Year 11, Cambridge University, Cambridge, 
 Reith F & Shuster J 2018, Geomicrobiology and biogeochemistry of precious metals, MDPI, Basel
 Roget's 21st Century Thesaurus, 3rd ed, Philip Lief Group
 Roher GS 2001, Structure and bonding in crystalline materials, Cambridge University Press, Cambridge, 
 Ropp RC 2012, Encyclopedia of the alkaline earth compounds, Elsevier, Oxford, 
 Roscoe HE & Schorlemmer FRS 1894, A treatise on chemistry: Volume II: The metals, D Appleton, New York
 Roza G 2009, Bromine, Rosen Publishing, New York, 
 Russell AM & Lee KL 2005, Structure-property relations in nonferrous metals, Wiley-Interscience, New York, 
 Ryan W (ed.) 1968, Non-ferrous Extractive Metallurgy in the United Kingdom, Institution of Mining and Metallurgy, London
 Samsonov GV 1968, Handbook of the physiochemical properties of the elements, I F I/Plenum, New York
 Sargent-Welch VWR International 2008, Chart of the elements: With electron distribution, Buffalo Grove, Illinois
 Savitsky EM 1961, The influence of temperature on the mechanical properties of metals and alloys, Stanford University Press, Stanford
 Sazhin NP 1961, 'Development of the metallurgy of the rare and minor metals in the USSR,' in IP Bardin (ed.), Metallurgy of the USSR, 1917-1957, volume 1, originally published by Metallurgizdat, State Scientific and Technical Publishing House of Literature on Ferrous and Nonferrous Metallurgy, Moscow, 1958; published for the National Science Foundation, Washington, DC and the Department of the Interior, USA by the Israel Program for Scientific Translations, Jerusalem, p.p. 744–64
 Schumann W 2008, Minerals of the World, 2nd ed., trans. by EE Reinersman, Sterling Publishing, New York, 
 Schwartz M 2010, Encyclopedia and handbook of materials, parts and finishes, 2nd ed., CRC Press, Boca Raton, Florida, 
 Schweitzer PA 2003, Metallic materials: Physical, mechanical, and corrosion properties, Marcel Dekker, New York, 
 Schwietzer GK & Pesterfield LL 2010, The aqueous chemistry of the elements, Oxford University, Oxford, 
 Science Education 1948, Deming, Horace G. Fundamental Chemistry. New York: John Wiley and Sons, Inc., 1947. 745 p. $4.00, book review, vol. 32, no. 2, 
 Scott EC & Kanda FA 1962, The nature of atoms and molecules: A general chemistry, Harper & Row, New York
 Sequeira CAC 2013, 'Diffusion coatings for the oil industry', in R Javaherdashti, C Nwaoha, H Tan (eds), Corrosion and materials in the oil and gas industries, RC Press, Boca Raton
 Sevov SC, Ostenson JE & Corbett JD 1993, 'K8In10Hg: a Zintl phase with isolated In10Hg clusters', Journal of Alloys and Compounds, vol. 202, nos. 1‒2, pp. 289–294, 
 Sidgwick NV 1937, The electronic theory of valence, Oxford University Press, London
 Sidgwick NV 1950, The Chemical Elements and Their Compounds: Volume I, Clarendon Press, Oxford
 Silberberg MS 2006, Chemistry: The Molecular Nature of Matter and Change, 4th ed., McGraw-Hill, New York, 
 Slabon A, Budnyk S, Cuervo-Reyes E, Wörle M, Mensing C & Nesper R 2012, 'Copper Silicides with the Highest Lithium Content: Li7CuSi2 Containing the 16-Electron Group [CuSi2]7− and Li7.3CuSi3 with Heterographene Nets[CuSi]3.3−', Angewandte Chemie International Edition,, vol. 51, no. 46, pp. 11594–11596, 
 Slater JC 1939, Introduction to chemical physics, McGraw-Hill Book Company, New York
 Smith DW 1990, Inorganic substances: A prelude to the study of descriptive inorganic chemistry, Cambridge University, Cambridge, 
 Sofin M, Fiese K, Nuss J, Peters EM & Jansen M 2002, 'Synthesis and Crystal Structure of Rb3AgO2', Zeitschrift für anorganische und allgemeine Chemie, vol. 628. no. 11, pp. 2500–4,
 Solov'eva VD, Svirchevskaya EG, Bobrova VV & El'tsov NM 1973, 'Solubility of copper, cadmium, and indium oxides in sodium hydroxide solutions', Trudy Instittua Metallurgii i Obogashcheniya, Akademiya Nauk Kazakhskoi SSR (Transactions of the Institute of Metallurgy and Ore Dressing, Academy of Sciences of the Kazakh SSR) vol. 49, pp. 37–44
 Sorensen EMB 1991, Metal poisoning in fish, CRC Press, Boca Raton, Florida, 
 Steele D 1966, The chemistry of the metallic elements, Pergamon Press, Oxford
 Steiner LE & Campbell JA 1955, General Chemistry, The Macmillan Company, New York
 Steiner LE & Campbell JA 1955, General Chemistry, The Macmillan Company, New York
 Strathern P 2000, Mendeleyev's dream: The quest for the elements, Hamish Hamilton, London, 
 Subba Rao GV & Shafer MW 1986, 'Intercalation in layered transition metal dichalcogenides', in F Lévy (ed), Intercalated Layered Materials, D Reidel, Dordrecht, pp. 99–200
 Takahashi N & Otozai K 1986, "The mechanism of the reaction of elementary astatine with organic solvents", Journal of Radioanalytical and Nuclear Chemistry, vol. 103, no. 1, pp. 1‒9, 
 Takahashi N, Yano D & Baba H 1992, "Chemical behavior of astatine molecules", Proceedings of the international conference on evolution in beam applications, Takasaki, Japan, November 5‒8, 1991, pp. 536‒539
 Taylor MJ & Brothers PJ 1993, 'Inorganic derivatives of the elements', in AJ Downs (ed.), Chemistry of aluminium, gallium, indium and thallium, Chapman & Hall, London, 
 Taylor N, Derbogosian M, Ng W, Stubbs A, Stokes R, Bowen S, Raphael S & Moloney J 2007, Study on chemistry 1, John Wiley & Sons, Milton, Queensland, 
 Temkin ON 2012, Homogeneous Catalysis with Metal Complexes: Kinetic Aspects and Mechanisms, John Wiley & Sons, Chichester, 
 Thayer JS 2010, 'Relativistic effects and the chemistry of the heavier main-group elements,' in Relativistic methods for chemists, M Barysz & Y Ishikawa (eds), pp. 63–98, Springer Science+Business Media B. V., Dordrecht, 
 Tóth I & Győri B 2005, 'Thallium: Inorganic chemistry', Encyclopedia of Inorganic Chemistry, RB King (ed.), 2nd ed., John Wiley & Sons, New York,  (set)
 US Department of Transportation, Maritime Administration 1987, Marine fire prevention, firefighting and fire safety, Washington DC
 Vanderah TA 1992, Chemistry of Superconductor Materials: Preparation, Chemistry, Characterization, and Theory, Noyes Publications, New Jersey, 
 Van Loon JC & Barefoot RR 1991, Determination of the precious metals: Selected instrumental methods, John Wiley & Sons, Chichester
 Van Wert LR 1936, An introduction to physical metallurgy, McGraw-Hill Book Company, New York
Vargel C 2004, Corrosion of aluminium, Elsevier, Amsterdam, 
Vernon RE 2020, "Organising the metals and nonmetals," Foundations of Chemistry, pp. 1−17,  (open access)
 Walker JD, Enache M & Newman MC 2013, Fundamental QSARS for metal ions, CRC Press, Boca Raton, Florida, 
 Wanamaker E & Pennington HR 1921, Electric arc welding, Simmons-Boardman, New York
 Wells AF 1985, Structural inorganic chemistry, 5th ed., Clarendon, Oxford, 
 Whitten KW, Davis RE, Peck LM & Stanley GG 2014, Chemistry, 10th ed., Thomson Brooks/Cole, Belmont, California, 
 Wiberg N 2001, Inorganic chemistry, Academic Press, San Diego, 
 Xia S & Bobev S 2006, 'Ba11Cd8Bi14: Bismuth zigzag chains in a ternary alkaline-earth transition-metal Zintl phase', Inorganic Chemistry, vol. 45, no. 18, pp. 7126–7132, 
 Young JA, Malik JG, Quagliano JV & Danehy JP 1969, 'Chemical queries. Especially for introductory chemistry teachers: Do elements in the zinc subgroup belong to the transition series?', Journal of Chemical Education, vol. 46, no. 4, pp. 227‒229 (228), 
 Zubieta JA & Zuckerman JJ 2009, 'Structural tin chemistry', in SJ Lippard (ed.), Progress in inorganic chemistry, vol. 24, pp. 251–476 (260), 
 Zuckerman JJ & Hagen AP 1989, Inorganic Reactions and Methods, the Formation of Bonds to Halogens, John Wiley & Sons, New York,

Further reading
Lowrie RS & Campbell-Ferguson HJ 1971, Inorganic and physical chemistry, 2nd ed., chapter 25: The B-metals, Pergamon Press, Oxford, pp. 306–318
Parish RV 1977, The metallic elements, chapter 9: The p-block metals, Longman, London, pp. 178–199
Phillips CSG & Williams RJP 1966, Inorganic chemistry, vol. 2: Metals, Clarendon Press, Oxford, pp. 459–537
Steele D 1966, The chemistry of the metallic elements, chapter 7: The later B-subgroup metals, Pergamon Press, Oxford, pp. 65–83

 
Metallic elements